Miljenko Rak (born 20 September 1947) is a Croatian former long-jumper and fitness trainer. He had worked as the trainer with Olympic gold medal winning skier, Janica Kostelić, and football manager, Slaven Bilić. He is currently fitness coach in Dinamo Zagreb and the Croatia men's national handball team.

Rak was the fitness coach for the Croatia national handball team that won the gold medal at the 2004 Summer Olympics in Athens.

Rak worked as a coach in Osijek training athletes such as 800-metre runner Slobodanka Čolović and long-jumper Siniša Ergotić.

Rak started as a footballing fitness coach with Dinamo Zagreb, after that he joined Slaven Bilić with the Croatia national football team. He followed Bilić to work with Lokomotiv Moscow, Beşiktaş and West Ham United. He left West Ham along with Bilić's other coaching staff when the manager was sacked on 6 November 2017.

In 2020, Rak joined the Croatia national handball team as the fitness coach again.

References

Living people
1947 births
Croatian male long jumpers
Croatian sports coaches
West Ham United F.C. non-playing staff
Croatian expatriate sportspeople in Russia
Croatian expatriate sportspeople in Turkey
Croatian expatriate sportspeople in England
University of Novi Sad alumni
Mediterranean Games gold medalists for Yugoslavia
Mediterranean Games medalists in athletics
Athletes (track and field) at the 1967 Mediterranean Games